Butcher Babies is the first EP released by the American heavy metal band Butcher Babies. It was self-released on May 29, 2012. The EP was produced by Andrew Murdock.

Reception
Rock Journalist Keith Valcourt stated on behalf of the Butcher Babies: “The Hottest Band in the World” in his review of a show. The Butcher Babies deliver a loud crashing blend of heavy metal, punk and thrash that recalls Pantera, adding their stage show embodies the horror antics of Alice Cooper and Rob Zombie. Carla and Heidi don’t merely sing: they assault the crowd with a blinding flash of aggression and abuse. And the crowd loves them for it.”

Release and promotion
On May 1, 2012, the Butcher Babies Premiered a New Song, "Mr. Slowdeath". On May 24, they released their first music video for "Mr. Slowdeath", produced by Mudrock (Avenged Sevenfold, Godsmack).

Track listing

Personnel

Butcher Babies
Heidi Shepherd – vocals
Carla Harvey – vocals
Jason Klein – bass
Henry Flury – guitar
Chris Warner  – drums

Production
Andrew Murdock – production

References

2012 EPs
Butcher Babies albums